Scheving is an Icelandic surname. Notable people with this surname include:

 Gunnlaugur Scheving (1904–1972), Icelandic painter
 Magnús Scheving (born 1964), Icelandic writer, entrepreneur, producer, actor, and athlete

Icelandic-language surnames